2173 Maresjev, provisional designation , is a dark background asteroid from the outer regions of the asteroid belt, approximately  in diameter. It was discovered on 22 August 1974, by Soviet–Ukrainian astronomer Lyudmila Zhuravleva at the Crimean Astrophysical Observatory in Nauchnij, on the Crimean peninsula. It was named for Soviet war veteran Alexey Maresyev. The assumed C-type asteroid has a tentative rotation period of 11.6 hours.

Orbit and classification 

Maresjev is a non-family asteroid from the main belt's background population. It orbits the Sun in the outer asteroid belt at a distance of 2.8–3.5 AU once every 5 years and 7 months (2,031 days; semi-major axis of 3.14 AU). Its orbit has an eccentricity of 0.11 and an inclination of 14° with respect to the ecliptic.

Physical characteristics 

Maresjev is an assumed carbonaceous C-type asteroid.

Rotation period 

In September 2007, a fragmentary rotational lightcurve of Maresjev was obtained from photometric observations by astronomers at the Oakley Observatory in the United States. Lightcurve analysis gave a rotation period of 11.6 hours with a brightness amplitude of 0.42 magnitude. As of 2018, no secure period has been obtained.

Diameter and albedo 

According to the surveys carried out by the Japanese Akari satellite and the NEOWISE mission of NASA's Wide-field Infrared Survey Explorer, Maresjev measures between 20.61 and 29.265 kilometers in diameter and its surface has an albedo between 0.0568 and 0.11.

The Collaborative Asteroid Lightcurve Link assumes an albedo of 0.0580 and calculates a diameter of 28.96 kilometers based on an absolute magnitude of 11.4.

Naming 

This minor planet was named after Alexey Maresyev (1916–2001), a Soviet war veteran and fighter ace. His story served as a basis for the novel Story about a True Man (also translated as Story of a Real Man) by Boris Polevoy, which became a popular Russian book that was eventually made into an opera. It was first published in English in 1952, and was reprinted in 1970.

The official naming citation was published by the Minor Planet Center on 1 April 1980.

References

External links 
 Asteroid Occultation Path Predictions – March 2016
 Asteroid Lightcurve Database (LCDB), query form (info )
 Dictionary of Minor Planet Names, Google books
 Asteroids and comets rotation curves, CdR – Observatoire de Genève, Raoul Behrend
 Discovery Circumstances: Numbered Minor Planets (1)-(5000) – Minor Planet Center
 
 

002173
Discoveries by Lyudmila Zhuravleva
Named minor planets
19740822